Bornholm is connected to the Swedish grid through the Bornholm Cable. The distribution network is owned by Bornholms Energi & Forsyning, formerly Østkraft.

Rønne Power Station 
Rønne Power Station has two steam units, one oil-fired with a generation capacity of 25 MW inaugurated in 1974, and a second one, which can be fired either with oil or coal. It was inaugurated in 1995 and has a generation capacity of 37 MW.

Power grid of Bornholm 
The power grid of Bornholm consists of a 60 kV-ring line connecting the substations Hasle, Olsker, Østerlars, Dalslunde, Bodilsker, Aakirkeby, Rønne-Syd, Rønne Power Station, Viadukten, Snorrebakken. Apart from the section between Ronne-Syd and Snorrebakken, it is an overhead line. From this ring line several 60 kV lines branch, which are all implemented as underground cables. These are the branch to Allinge starting at Olsker, that to Gudhjem starting at Østerlars, a branch to Svaneke starting at Dalslunde, a branch to Svaneke via Nexo starting at Bodilsker, a branch to Poulsker starting at Bodilker. A further branch to Westhaven starts at Rønne Power Station. A further connection built as underground cable connects Hasle substation with Rønne-Nord, Viadukten and Ronne-South.

Technical data of 60 kV Substations of Bornholm

References 

Bornholm
Electric power infrastructure in Denmark